The Miltimore House is a historic house in South Pasadena, California, U.S.. It was designed by architect Irving Gill. It has been listed on the National Register of Historic Places since March 24, 1972.

References

Houses on the National Register of Historic Places in California
Houses in Los Angeles County, California